The 2011 Tim Hortons Brier, the Canadian men's national curling championship, was held March 5 until March 13, 2011 at the John Labatt Centre in London, Ontario. This event marked the 30th time that the province of Ontario has hosted the Brier since it began in 1927 in Toronto, Ontario and the first time a Bronze Medal Game was added to the playoffs.

In the final, Manitoba's Jeff Stoughton defeated Ontario's Glenn Howard 8–6. Team Manitoba were nearly perfect in the game, curling a record 96%. The team led 4–2 after 5, and stole two points in the sixth to take a 6–2 lead, after Howard was light on a draw. Stoughton's win was the first win for Manitoba in 12 years, when he last won the event, and was the 27th title for the province. A total of 8,261 spectators were on hand to watch the final. Team Stoughton went on to represent Canada at the 2011 World Men's Curling Championship, where they won the gold medal.

Teams
For the second straight year, the defending champion was missing from the Brier. Kevin Koe's Brier champion and World champion rink lost in the Alberta provincial final to Kevin Martin's reigning Olympic champion rink, who played in his 11th Brier.

Representing Manitoba was the former world champion Jeff Stoughton rink, who has represented Manitoba in 5 of the last 6 years. He defeated the Mike McEwen rink, who at the time was ranked #1 in the CTRS, in the Manitoba provincial final.

Returning from Ontario was the former world champion Glenn Howard rink, who has won a record six straight provincial championships.

Returning from Newfoundland and Labrador was the former Olympic champion Brad Gushue, who has won eight of the last nine provincial championships. The Gushue rink was fresh off a break up with Albertan Randy Ferbey who skipped the team in a few World Curling Tour events this season.

The 2005 Brier runner-up Shawn Adams skipped for Team Nova Scotia.

Representing Saskatchewan was Steve Laycock, who made his Brier skipping debut with Pat Simmons as fourth, while looking to win the 4th national title of the year for Saskatchewan, following two Canadian Junior titles and one Scotties title.

The 2010 Brier bronze medalist Brad Jacobs represented Northern Ontario once again.

Jim Cotter skipped Team British Columbia for the first time, taking over the position for an injured Bob Ursel.

The 1997 & 2002 Brier bronze medallist James Grattan represented New Brunswick for a 9th time. His second, Steve Howard, is Glenn Howard's nephew.

Jamie Koe returned to play in his fifth Brier representing the Northwest Territories/Yukon team, hoping to improve on his last place finish in 2010.

Playing in his first Brier since 1994 was Prince Edward Island's Eddie MacKenzie who was also skipping for the first time.

And finally, François Gagné of Quebec played in his first Brier after upsetting former Brier champion Jean-Michel Ménard in the Quebec provincial final.

Round robin standings
Final Round Robin Standings

Results
All draw times are listed in Eastern Standard Time (UTC−5).

Draw 1
Saturday, March 5, 2:30 pm

Draw 2
Saturday, March 5, 7:30 pm

Draw 3
Sunday, March 6, 9:30 am

Draw 4
Sunday, March 6, 2:30 pm

Draw 5
Sunday, March 6, 7:30 pm

Draw 6
Monday, March 7, 9:30 am

Draw 7
Monday, March 7, 2:30 pm

Draw 8
Monday, March 7, 7:30 pm

Draw 9
Tuesday, March 8, 9:30 am

Draw 10
Tuesday, March 8, 2:30 pm

Draw 11
Tuesday, March 8, 7:30 pm

Draw 12
Wednesday, March 9, 9:30 am

Draw 13
Wednesday, March 9, 2:30 pm

Team P.E.I. was fined $2000 for quitting the game before the 7th end.

Draw 14
Wednesday, March 9, 7:30 pm

Draw 15
Thursday, March 10, 9:30 am

Draw 16
Thursday, March 10, 2:30 pm

Draw 17
Thursday, March 10, 7:30 pm

Playoffs

1 vs. 2
Friday, March 11, 7:30 pm

3 vs. 4
Saturday, March 12, 2:30 pm

In the 9th end, Alberta and Ontario's rocks were so close to the tee (the pin hole), that a measurement could not be made, and the umpire ( Keith Reilly 1967 Brier Champion from Ontario ) had to make a call.  While Alberta scored the point, Ontario scored two in the 10th to win when Martin missed his last shot, a raise attempt against two, giving Ontario the victory with Howard not having to throw his last.

Semifinal
Saturday, March 12, 7:30 pm

Bronze medal game
Sunday, March 13, 2:30 pm

Final
Sunday, March 13, 7:30 pm

Statistics

Top 5 player percentages
Round Robin only

Awards and honours
All-Star Teams
First Team
Skip: Glenn Howard (Ontario)
Third: Jon Mead (Manitoba)
Second: Marc Kennedy (Alberta)
Lead: Ben Hebert (Alberta)

Second Team
Skip: Jeff Stoughton (Manitoba)
Third: Richard Hart (Ontario)
Second: Brent Laing (Ontario)
Lead: Craig Savill (Ontario)

Ross Harstone Award
Jim Cotter (British Columbia)

Scotty Harper Award – Media Award
Jim Henderson, SWEEP Magazine (third win) – $500 award

Paul McLean Award
Michael Burns Jr., CCA photographer

Notes

References

 
Sports competitions in London, Ontario
The Brier
Curling in Ontario
Tim Hortons Brier
Tim Hortons Brier
Tim Hortons Brier